Wisran Hadi (born 27 June 1945, Padang, West Sumatra – died 28 June 2011, Padang) was an Indonesian writer. He graduated from the Indonesian Arts Academy (now Institut Seni Indonesia) Jakarta, and won the Script Writing Competition held by the Jakarta Arts Council (JAC). He joined the International Writing Program at Iowa University, United States, in 1977. He won an award from the Ministry of Culture and Tourism (Indonesia).

Wisran wrote a collection of four plays entitled "The Malays Four": "Senandung Peninsula", "Dara Orange", "Gading Cempaka" and "Cindua Mato" (which was awarded the S.E.A. Write Award in 2000). He also wrote the novels Guest, Priest, and Simpang, as well as short stories such as "Autumn Leaves Mahogany Again".

External links
  Wisran Hadi profile page on the Ministry of National Languages Institute
  0.20110628 to 343,715, id.html writers Wisran Hadi Dies Tempo Interactive, accessed June 28, 2011

1945 births
2011 deaths
Indonesian writers
International Writing Program alumni